The women's 100 metres hurdles competition at the 2012 Summer Olympics in London, United Kingdom was held at the Olympic Stadium on 6–7 August.

The semi-finals showed all the top athletes were at their best, with the first 5 finalists achieving their personal best, except Sally Pearson who improved the 2012 world leading time, and Nevin Yanıt's new national record for Turkey.

In the final under London rains, Pearson led from the start but after ticking a hurdle, defending champion Dawn Harper closed fast to make it close. Kellie Wells was solidly in third while Lolo Jones edged Yanit for fourth place. It was an Olympic record for Pearson, a new personal best for Harper and Wells, equal national record for Yanit in 5th, equal personal best for 6th place Phylicia George and a season best for Jones after a difficult journey from the next to last hurdle four years earlier.

Competition format
The women's 100m Hurdles competition consisted of heats (Round 1), Semifinals and a Final. The fastest competitors from each race in the heats qualified for the Semifinals along with the fastest overall competitors not already qualified that were required to fill the available spaces in the Semifinals. A total of eight competitors qualified for the Final from the Semifinals.

Records
, the existing World and Olympic records were as follows.

The following new Olympic record was set during this competition:

Schedule
All times are British Summer Time (UTC+1).

Results

Round 1
Qual. rule: first 3 of each heat (Q) plus the 6 fastest times (q) qualified.

Heat 1

Rahamatou Drame was disqualified for false starting.

Heat 2

Heat 3

Heat 4

Heat 5

Ekaterina Poplavskaya ran off the track after failing to clear her fourth hurdle, and was therefore disqualified.

Heat 6

Semi-finals

Qual. rule: first 2 of each heat (Q) plus the 2 fastest times (q) qualified.

Heat 1

Reïna-Flor Okori was disqualified for false starting.

Heat 2

Heat 3

Marzia Caravelli stopped running after failing to clear the fourth hurdle and was disqualified.

Final
Wind: −0.2 m/s

References

Athletics at the 2012 Summer Olympics
Sprint hurdles at the Olympics
2012 in women's athletics
Women's events at the 2012 Summer Olympics